In coding theory, the Bose–Chaudhuri–Hocquenghem codes (BCH codes) form a class of cyclic error-correcting codes that are constructed using polynomials over a finite field (also called Galois field). BCH codes were invented in 1959 by French mathematician Alexis Hocquenghem, and independently in 1960 by Raj Chandra Bose and D.K. Ray-Chaudhuri. The name Bose–Chaudhuri–Hocquenghem (and the acronym BCH) arises from the initials of the inventors' surnames (mistakenly, in the case of Ray-Chaudhuri).

One of the key features of BCH codes is that during code design, there is a precise control over the number of symbol errors correctable by the code. In particular, it is possible to design binary BCH codes that can correct multiple bit errors. Another advantage of BCH codes is the ease with which they can be decoded, namely, via an algebraic method known as syndrome decoding. This simplifies the design of the decoder for these codes, using small low-power electronic hardware.

BCH codes are used in applications such as satellite communications, compact disc players, DVDs, disk drives, USB flash drives, solid-state drives, quantum-resistant cryptography and two-dimensional bar codes.

Definition and illustration

Primitive narrow-sense BCH codes 
Given a prime number  and prime power  with positive integers  and  such that , a primitive narrow-sense BCH code over the finite field (or Galois field)  with code length  and distance at least  is constructed by the following method.

The generator polynomial of the BCH code is defined as the least common multiple .

Example 
There are fourteen minimum polynomials  with coefficients in  satisfying

The minimal polynomials are

The BCH code with  has generator polynomial

It has minimal Hamming distance at least 3 and corrects up to one error. Since the generator polynomial is of degree 4, this code has 11 data bits and 4 checksum bits.

The BCH code with  has generator polynomial

It has minimal Hamming distance at least 5 and corrects up to two errors. Since the generator polynomial is of degree 8, this code has 7 data bits and 8 checksum bits.

The BCH code with  has generator polynomial

It has minimal Hamming distance at least 7 and corrects up to three errors. Since the generator polynomial is of degree 10, this code has 5 data bits and 10 checksum bits. (This particular generator polynomial has a real-world application, in the format patterns of the QR code.)

This code has minimal Hamming distance 15 and corrects 7 errors. It has 1 data bit and 14 checksum bits. In fact, this code has only two codewords: 000000000000000 and 111111111111111.

General BCH codes 
General BCH codes differ from primitive narrow-sense BCH codes in two respects.

First, the requirement that  be a primitive element of  can be relaxed.

Second, the consecutive roots of the generator polynomial may run from  instead of 

Definition. Fix a finite field  where  is a prime power.

The generator polynomial of the BCH code is defined as the least common multiple 

Note: if  as in the simplified definition, then  is 1, and the order of  modulo  is 
Therefore, the simplified definition is indeed a special case of the general one.

Special cases 

The generator polynomial  of a BCH code has coefficients from 
The other type of Reed Solomon code is an original view Reed Solomon code which is not a BCH code.

Properties 

The generator polynomial of a BCH code has degree at most .

Each minimal polynomial  has degree at most . Moreover, if  then  for all . Therefore,  is the least common multiple of at most  minimal polynomials  for odd indices  each of degree at most .

A BCH code has minimal Hamming distance at least .

Suppose that  is a code word with fewer than  non-zero terms. Then

 

This implies that  satisfy the following equations, for each :

 

In matrix form, we have
 

The determinant of this matrix equals

The matrix  is seen to be a Vandermonde matrix, and its determinant is

which is non-zero. It therefore follows that  hence 

A BCH code is cyclic.

Encoding 
Because any polynomial that is a multiple of the generator polynomial is a valid BCH codeword, BCH encoding is merely the process of finding some polynomial that has the generator as a factor.

The BCH code itself is not prescriptive about the meaning of the coefficients of the polynomial; conceptually, a BCH decoding algorithm's sole concern is to find the valid codeword with the minimal Hamming distance to the received codeword. Therefore, the BCH code may be implemented either as a systematic code or not, depending on how the implementor chooses to embed the message in the encoded polynomial.

Non-systematic encoding: The message as a factor 

The most straightforward way to find a polynomial that is a multiple of the generator is to compute the product of some arbitrary polynomial and the generator. In this case, the arbitrary polynomial can be chosen using the symbols of the message as coefficients.

As an example, consider the generator polynomial , chosen for use in the (31, 21) binary BCH code used by POCSAG and others. To encode the 21-bit message {101101110111101111101}, we first represent it as a polynomial over :

Then, compute (also over ):

Thus, the transmitted codeword is {1100111010010111101011101110101}.

Systematic encoding: The message as a prefix 

A systematic code is one in which the message appears verbatim somewhere within the codeword.

This encoding method leverages the fact that subtracting the remainder from a dividend results in a multiple of the divisor.

Here, we see that  is a valid codeword.

Over  (i.e. with binary BCH codes), this process is indistinguishable from appending a cyclic redundancy check, and if a systematic binary BCH code is used only for error-detection purposes, we see that BCH codes are just a generalization of the mathematics of cyclic redundancy checks.

The advantage to the systematic coding is that the receiver can recover the original message by discarding everything after the first  coefficients, after performing error correction.

Decoding 
There are many algorithms for decoding BCH codes. The most common ones follow this general outline:
 Calculate the syndromes sj for the received vector 
 Determine the number of errors t and the error locator polynomial Λ(x) from the syndromes 
 Calculate the roots of the error location polynomial to find the error locations Xi
 Calculate the error values Yi at those error locations 
 Correct the errors

During some of these steps, the decoding algorithm may determine that the received vector has too many errors and cannot be corrected. For example, if an appropriate value of t is not found, then the correction would fail. In a truncated (not primitive) code, an error location may be out of range. If the received vector has more errors than the code can correct, the decoder may unknowingly produce an apparently valid message that is not the one that was sent.

Calculate the syndromes
The received vector  is the sum of the correct codeword  and an unknown error vector  The syndrome values are formed by considering  as a polynomial and evaluating it at  Thus the syndromes are

If there is no error,  for all  If the syndromes are all zero, then the decoding is done.

Calculate the error location polynomial
If there are nonzero syndromes, then there are errors. The decoder needs to figure out how many errors and the location of those errors.

Then the first two syndromes are

If there are two or more errors,

It is not immediately obvious how to begin solving the resulting syndromes for the unknowns  and 

The first step is finding, compatible with computed syndromes and with minimal possible  locator polynomial:

Three popular algorithms for this task are:
 Peterson–Gorenstein–Zierler algorithm
 Berlekamp–Massey algorithm
 Sugiyama Euclidean algorithm

Peterson–Gorenstein–Zierler algorithm

Peterson's algorithm is the step 2 of the generalized BCH decoding procedure. Peterson's algorithm is used to calculate the error locator polynomial coefficients   of a polynomial

 

Now the procedure of the Peterson–Gorenstein–Zierler algorithm. Expect we have at least 2t syndromes sc, …, sc+2t−1. Let v = t.

Factor error locator polynomial
Now that you have the  polynomial, its roots can be found in the form  by brute force for example using the Chien search algorithm. The exponential
powers of the primitive element  will yield the positions where errors occur in the received word; hence the name 'error locator' polynomial.

The zeros of Λ(x) are α−i1, …, α−iv.

Calculate error values
Once the error locations are known, the next step is to determine the error values at those locations. The error values are then used to correct the received values at those locations to recover the original codeword.

For the case of binary BCH, (with all characters readable) this is trivial; just flip the bits for the received word at these positions, and we have the corrected code word. In the more general case, the error weights  can be determined by solving the linear system

Forney algorithm 
However, there is a more efficient method known as the Forney algorithm.

Let

And the error evaluator polynomial

Finally:

where

Than if syndromes could be explained by an error word, which could be nonzero only on positions , then error values are

For narrow-sense BCH codes, c = 1, so the expression simplifies to:

Explanation of Forney algorithm computation 
It is based on Lagrange interpolation and techniques of generating functions.

We want to compute unknowns  and we could simplify the context by removing the  terms. This leads to the error evaluator polynomial

Thanks to  we have

To get  we just should get rid of the product. We could compute the product directly from already computed roots  of  but we could use simpler form.

As formal derivative

we get again only one summand in

So finally

This formula is advantageous when one computes the formal derivative of  form

yielding:

where

Decoding based on extended Euclidean algorithm 
An alternate process of finding both the polynomial Λ and the error locator polynomial is based on Yasuo Sugiyama's adaptation of the Extended Euclidean algorithm. Correction of unreadable characters could be incorporated to the algorithm easily as well.

Let  be positions of unreadable characters. One creates polynomial localising these positions 
Set values on unreadable positions to 0 and compute the syndromes.

As we have already defined for the Forney formula let 

Let us run extended Euclidean algorithm for locating least common divisor of polynomials  and 
The goal is not to find the least common divisor, but a polynomial  of degree at most  and polynomials  such that 
Low degree of  guarantees, that  would satisfy extended (by ) defining conditions for 

The main advantage of the algorithm is that it meanwhile computes  required in the Forney formula.

Explanation of the decoding process 
The goal is to find a codeword which differs from the received word minimally as possible on readable positions. When expressing the received word as a sum of nearest codeword and error word, we are trying to find error word with minimal number of non-zeros on readable positions. Syndrom  restricts error word by condition

We could write these conditions separately or we could create polynomial

and compare coefficients near powers  to 

Suppose there is unreadable letter on position  we could replace set of syndromes  by set of syndromes  defined by equation  Suppose for an error word all restrictions by original set  of syndromes hold,
than

New set of syndromes restricts error vector

This shortens the set of syndromes by 

In polynomial formulation, the replacement of syndromes set  by syndromes set  leads to

Therefore,

One could consider looking for error positions from the point of view of eliminating influence of given positions similarly as for unreadable characters. If we found  positions such that eliminating their influence leads to obtaining set of syndromes consisting of all zeros, than there exists error vector with errors only on these coordinates.
If  denotes the polynomial eliminating the influence of these coordinates, we obtain

In Euclidean algorithm, we try to correct at most  errors (on readable positions), because with bigger error count there could be more codewords in the same distance from the received word. Therefore, for  we are looking for, the equation must hold for coefficients near powers starting from

In Forney formula,  could be multiplied by a scalar giving the same result.

It could happen that the Euclidean algorithm finds  of degree higher than  having number of different roots equal to its degree, where the Fourney formula would be able to correct errors in all its roots, anyway correcting such many errors could be risky (especially with no other restrictions on received word). Usually after getting  of higher degree, we decide not to correct the errors. Correction could fail in the case  has roots with higher multiplicity or the number of roots is smaller than its degree. Fail could be detected as well by Forney formula returning error outside the transmitted alphabet.

Correct the errors
Using the error values and error location, correct the errors and form a corrected code vector by subtracting error values at error locations.

Decoding examples

Decoding of binary code without unreadable characters 
(This is used in QR codes.) Let the message to be transmitted be [1 1 0 1 1], or in polynomial notation, 
These are appended to the message, so the transmitted codeword is [ 1 1 0 1 1 1 0 0 0 0 1 0 1 0 0 ].

Now, imagine that there are two bit-errors in the transmission, so the received codeword is [ 1  0 1 1 1 0 0 0  1 0 1 0 0 ]. In polynomial notation:

In order to correct the errors, first calculate the syndromes. Taking  we have      and 
Next, apply the Peterson procedure by row-reducing the following augmented matrix.

Due to the zero row,  is singular, which is no surprise since only two errors were introduced into the codeword.
The exponents of  correspond to the error locations.
There is no need to calculate the error values in this example, as the only possible value is 1.

Decoding with unreadable characters 
Suppose the same scenario, but the received word has two unreadable characters [ 1  0 ? 1 1 ? 0 0  1 0 1 0 0 ]. For computation checking we can use the same representation for addition as was used in previous example.

Let us make syndrome polynomial

compute

Run the extended Euclidean algorithm:

We have reached polynomial of degree at most 3, and as

we get

Therefore,

Let

Let us look for error values using formula

where  are roots of   We get

Fact, that  should not be surprising.

Corrected code is therefore [ 1  0  1 1  0 0  1 0 1 0 0].

Decoding with unreadable characters with a small number of errors 
Let us show the algorithm behaviour for the case with small number of errors. Let the received word is [ 1  0 ? 1 1 ? 0 0 0 1 0 1 0 0 ].

Again, replace the unreadable characters by zeros while creating the polynomial reflecting their positions 
Compute the syndromes  and 
Create syndrome polynomial

Let us run the extended Euclidean algorithm:

We have reached polynomial of degree at most 3, and as
 
we get
 

Therefore,
 

Let 

Let us look for error values using formula  where  are roots of polynomial 
 

We get

The fact that  should not be surprising.

Corrected code is therefore [ 1  0  1 1  0 0 0 1 0 1 0 0].

Citations

References

Primary sources

Secondary sources
  Course notes are apparently being redone for 2012: http://www.stanford.edu/class/ee387/

Further reading
 
 
 
 
 

Error detection and correction
Finite fields
Coding theory